Laser Background is an American psychedelic pop band from Philadelphia, Pennsylvania, United States.

Members
Current 
Andy Molholt – vocals, guitar, keyboard (2012–present)

Discography

Albums
 Super Future Montage (2013, La Société Expéditionnaire)
 Correct (2016, La Société Expéditionnaire)
 Dark Nuclear Bogs (2017, Endless Daze)

EPs
 Laser Background EP (2012, Stroll On Records)
 Kelly Wisdom EP (2015, Endless Daze)

References

External links
 

Psychedelic pop music groups
Musical groups from Philadelphia
Musical groups established in 2012
Indie rock musical groups from Pennsylvania
2012 establishments in Pennsylvania